Jakir Khan (1962/63 – 19 October 2019) was a Bangladeshi film director. He directed eleven films  before his death on 19 October 2019 at the age of 56.

Selected filmography
 Char Okkhorer Valobasa
 Moner Ojante
 Mon Churi
 Rangamon

References

People from Narsingdi District
Bangladeshi film directors
1960s births
2019 deaths